Entertainment law, also referred to as media law, is legal services provided to the entertainment industry. These services in entertainment law overlap with intellectual property law. Intellectual property has many moving parts that include trademarks, copyright, and the "Right of Publicity". However, the practice of entertainment law often involves questions of employment law, contract law, torts, labor law, bankruptcy law, immigration, securities law, security interests, agency, right of privacy, defamation, advertising, criminal law, tax law, International law (especially Private international law), and insurance law.

Much of the work of an entertainment law practice is transaction based, i.e., drafting contracts, negotiation and mediation. Some situations may lead to litigation or arbitration.

Overview 
Entertainment law covers an area of law that involves media of all different types (e.g. TV, film, music, publishing, advertising, Internet & news media, etc.) and stretches over various legal fields, which include corporate, finance, intellectual property, publicity and privacy, and the First Amendment to the United States Constitution in the United States.

For film, entertainment attorneys work with the actor's agent to finalize the actor's contracts for upcoming projects. After an agent lines up work for a star, the entertainment attorney negotiates with the agent and buyer of the actor's talent for compensation and profit participation. Entertainment attorneys are under strict confidentiality agreements, so the specifics of their job are kept top secret. But, some entertainment attorney's job descriptions have become comparable to those of a star's agent, manager or publicist. Most entertainment attorneys have many other roles as well such as assisting in building a client's career.

History
As the popularity of media became widespread, the field of media law became more popular and needed leaving certain corporate professionals wanting to participate more in media. As a result, many young lawyers fledged into media law for the opportunity to build more connections in media, become a media presenter, or even land an acting role. As technology continues to make huge advancements, many lawsuits have begun to arise, which makes the demand for lawyers extremely necessary.

Categories
Entertainment law is generally sub-divided into the following areas related to the types of activities that have their own specific trade unions, production techniques, rules, customs, case law, and negotiation strategies:

 FILM: option agreements, chain of title issues, talent agreements (screenwriters, film directors, actors, composers, production designers), production and post production and trade union issues, distribution issues, motion picture industry negotiations, distribution, and general intellectual property issues especially relating to copyright and, to a lesser extent, trademarks;
 INTERNET: Censorship, Copyright, Freedom of information, Information Technology, Privacy, and Telecommunications issues;
 MULTIMEDIA: software licensing issues, video game development and production, Information technology law, and general intellectual property issues;
 MUSIC: talent agreements (musicians, composers), producer agreements, and synchronization rights, music industry negotiation and general intellectual property issues, especially relating to copyright (see music law);
 PUBLISHING and PRINT MEDIA: advertising, models, author agreements and general intellectual property issues, especially relating to copyright;
 TELEVISION and RADIO: broadcast licensing and regulatory issues, mechanical licenses, and general intellectual property issues, especially relating to copyright;
 THEATRE: rental agreements and co-production agreements, and other performance oriented legal issues;
 VISUAL ARTS AND DESIGN: fine arts, issues of consignment of artworks to art dealers, moral rights of sculptors regarding works in public places; and industrial design, issues related to the protection of graphic design elements in products.

Defamation (libel and slander), personality rights and privacy rights issues also arise in entertainment law.

Media law is a legal field that refers to the following:

 Advertising
 Broadcasting
 Censorship
 Confidentiality
 Contempt
 Copyright
 Corporate Law

 Defamation
 Entertainment
 Freedom of information
 Internet
 Information Technology
 Privacy
 Telecommunications

Cases

 Copyright: In Golan v. Holder, the Supreme Court ruled, in a 6–2 vote, the judges dismissed contentions in light of the First Amendment and the Constitution's copyright provision, stating that the general population was not "a class of sacred centrality" and that copyright insurances may be extended regardless of whether they did not strive for new attempts to be made.
 Internet: In 2007, Viacom, a media aggregate that possesses MTV and Comedy Central TV, sued YouTube for $1 billion in light of copyright infringement claims for the unapproved posting of Viacom copyrighted material. In May 2008, YouTube began utilizing its advanced fingerprinting innovation to secure copyright-ensured content.
 Television: In an 8-0 choice, the Supreme Court held that in light of the fact that the FCC rules at the time did not cover "short lived exclamations," the fines issued against Fox were unethical and subsequently discredited as "illegally unclear".
 Music: Kesha v. Dr. Luke – In 2014, singer Kesha filed a civil suit against music producer Lukasz Sebastian Gottwald, also referred to some as Dr. Luke for gender-based hate crimes and emotional distress. This civil suit caused Gottwald to in return sue Kesha for defamation and breach of contract. This case ended with a judge declining to release Kesha from her binding contract that prohibited her from continuing her career effectively. The judge took note that Kesha had entered an agreement after she had sworn under oath that no harassment was taking place. Many celebrities such as Miley Cyrus, Lady Gaga, and Demi Lovato have shown support for Kesha in an attempt to broadcast the injustice contract laws have played in the outcome of this case. Singer-songwriter Taylor Swift donated $250,000 to relieve Kesha of any financial obligations.

See also
Communications law
Morals clause
Intellectual property
Media reform
Media regulation
Music law
Engineering law
Sports law
Sunshine in the Courtroom Act
Safe listening
Performing arts education
 Performing arts

References

 
Mass media
Media law
Entertainment
Performing arts